Quest is a British and Irish free-to-air television channel available in the United Kingdom and Ireland. Quest provides factual, lifestyle, entertainment programmes and other imported material, as well as sports coverage. The channel is operated by Warner Bros. Discovery.

History

Launch
In October 2008, Discovery announced that they would launch a channel on Freeview in early 2009, but without using the "Discovery" name. A placeholder appeared on Freeview channel 47 on 5 January 2009 and Tiscali TV channel 109 on 14 May 2009. Although the channel planned to launch on 14 May 2009 at 10am, after broadcasting a promo loop on the planned launch morning, at 10am the channel returned to displaying a "Coming soon" message.

The Quest website displayed a message reading: "Regrettably we have made the decision to postpone the launch of Quest. Due to a number of commercial factors we have had to make this difficult decision. We did not make this decision lightly and we are working towards launching Quest in the near future. We would like to apologise wholeheartedly to any of you that have been looking forward to this launch."

In August 2009, Discovery Networks announced that it planned to launch the channel on 30 September 2009. At the same time the channel moved to channel 38. Quest launched on Sky, on 1 October 2009, after acquiring an EPG slot from Information TV 2. Quest +1 launched on Sky, replacing DMAX +1.5 on 2 November 2009.

Quest launched on Virgin Media on 25 March 2010 on channel 179.

Quest moved to channel 12 on Freeview, a space previously occupied by Dave, due to its owner Discovery, Inc. acquiring Good Food, Home and Really from the UKTV network (which owns Dave) as part of a deal with BBC Studios.

Quest HD is available on Swisscom TV (IPTV) in Switzerland since November 2019

In November 2022, Quest Red +1 closed on Freeview and Quest moved from the COM4/SDN multiplex to the COM6/ArqB multiplex.

Full-time
On 15 October 2010, Quest began broadcasting a 24-hour schedule on all platforms except Freeview. On 30 June 2011, Gems TV acquired a 24-hour Freeview stream, ending their timeshare with Quest, allowing Quest to begin broadcasting for 24 hours a day on Freeview as well.

Quest +1 on Freeview
At the beginning of March 2014, Quest +1 appeared on Freeview channel 57. On 27 May 2014, Quest moved on Freeview to channel 37 and Quest +1 moved to channel 38. On 15 March 2017 it moved to channel 92 due to the launch of sister channel Quest Red, and later channels 76 and 69 following closures. Quest +1 and Quest Red +1 received changes in 2019 as Quest Red +1 moved to 72 while Quest +1 increased broadcast hours to 24 hour rather than 7pm to 7am.

Sports coverage
On 21 July 2014, Quest announced that they would be broadcasting live football in the form of the 2014 Schalke 04 Cup - a pre-season tournament featuring the likes of Newcastle United F.C. and West Ham United F.C. Five months later the channel broadcast live coverage of the Dubai Challenge Cup.

Speedway highlights are also shown on Quest.

Since 2016, Quest has showed coverage of the British Superbike Championship live, free-to-air. Originally, it was to avoid a clash with other events being shown on Eurosport's normal broadcast channels, but subsequently the event has regularly been shown on the channel either live or by highlights.

In late 2016, Quest broadcast live coverage and highlights of the new Home Series International Snooker Series, Quest broadcast afternoon sessions live of the English, Scottish and Northern Irish Opens with evening coverage exclusively on Eurosport and highlights.  Both Eurosport & Quest cover the final sessions of each tournament live.  The coverage is presented by Andy Goldstein or Colin Murray alongside Jimmy White, Neal Foulds & Ronnie O'Sullivan with commentary by the usual Eurosport commentators Joe Johnson, Neal Foulds, Dave Hendon & Philip Studd.

Since 5 January 2019, Quest has shown live coverage and highlights of the BDO World Darts Championship, BDO World Trophy and the World Masters. Quest shares coverage with sister channel Eurosport.

Quest also shows parts of the 24 Hours of Le Mans each year along with its sister channels Eurosport 1 and Eurosport 2 and also broadcast highlights of the MotoGP World Championship along with Moto2 and Moto3 beginning in 2019 and 2020.

English Football League (EFL)

Kicking-off from the 2018–19 season, the four-year deal will see Quest provide 90 minutes of extensive match highlights of the English Championship, League One and League Two, hosted by Colin Murray, in primetime at 9pm every Saturday night. As a result, the channel announced an HD version would launch in July 2018. It launched on 21 July 2018 on Virgin Media channel 217 but was removed on 24 July 2018. It officially launched on 2 August 2018 on Virgin Media, on 3 August on Freesat and Sky, and on 14 August on Freeview.

The EFL said in its news release on 4 May 2018 that "the partnership between the EFL and Quest will guarantee accessible high quality, free-to-air coverage for football fans across the country". When the first show was broadcast on 4 August 2018, viewers experienced frequent breakup of picture and the screen aspect was reduced to the obsolete 4:3 ratio. Numerous complaints were made and Digital Spy ran a feature on the impact of the "technical difficulties". Quest claimed that "some" viewers experienced problems but the Digital Spy investigation strongly suggests that everyone was impacted. Quest added that they were working to resolve the issue.

Sky channel moves
On 17 October 2013, Quest moved from 154 to 167 on Sky, while TLC +1 moved from 195 to 154, and Quest +1 moved from 167 to 195.

On 16 July 2015, Quest moved from 167 to 144 on Sky, switching places with sister channel DMAX.

Quest and Quest Red removed their encryption and began broadcasting free-to-air on satellite in June 2017, and were added to the Freesat guide early in July.

As part of Sky's major EPG reshuffle on 1 May 2018, Quest +1 moved from channel 195 to 244 (due to Quest not moving from channel 144).

Logos

See also
Quest Red
Quest Arabiya
EFL on Quest
The FBI Files
Salvage Hunters
Quest (U.S. TV network)
Forensic Detectives

References

External links

Television channels and stations established in 2009
English-language television stations in the United Kingdom
Warner Bros. Discovery networks
2009 establishments in the United Kingdom
Warner Bros. Discovery EMEA